Mauro Santiago Silveira Lacuesta (born 6 May 2000) is a Uruguayan professional footballer who plays as a goalkeeper for Uruguayan Primera División club Montevideo Wanderers.

Career statistics

References

External links

2000 births
Living people
Montevideo Wanderers F.C. players
Uruguayan Primera División players
Uruguayan footballers
Uruguay youth international footballers
Association football goalkeepers
Uruguay under-20 international footballers